Humane Farm Animal Care is a non-profit organization established to promote and administer its certification and labeling program, Certified Humane Raised & Handled, for meat, dairy, eggs and poultry raised under its animal care standards in the US. It is governed by a board of directors and retains a scientific committee which includes scientists and veterinarians. The organization is endorsed by the American Society for the Prevention of Cruelty to Animals.

History 
Both the organization and the Certified Humane Raised & Handled program were founded in 2003, by Adele Douglass. In the late 1990s, Douglass had traveled to England to study a brand of farm products which advertised as derived from humanely raised animals.

Mission 
Humane Farm Animal Care's mission is "improving the lives of farm animals in food production from birth through slaughter."

"Certified Humane Raised and Handled" program 
The certification program requires the inspection of aspects of production, including raising of live animals, slaughter and the processing/packaging of animal products, to ensure the authenticity of the Certified Humane Raised & Handled label. The program provides documents detailing certification program requirements and specifications, as well as standards for animal care and slaughter. The program is ISO Guide 65 accredited (the USDA is the accrediting agency in the US).

References 

Non-profit organizations based in Virginia
Animal welfare organizations based in the United States
2003 establishments in Virginia